"Over and Over" is a song by the Japanese J-pop group Every Little Thing, released as the group's eleventh single on January 27, 1999. It was used for the drama Border: Hanzaishinri Sōsa File.

Track listing
 Over and Over (Words & music - Mitsuru Igarashi) 
 Over and Over: Hal's remix
 Over and Over (instrumental)

Chart positions

Other versions

"Over and Over / ELT Songs from L.A." is a double A-side single, the thirteenth single released by the Japanese J-pop group Every Little Thing, released on October 20, 1999.

Track listing
 Over and Over
 
 Looking Back On Your Love
 Over and Over: Instrumental
 : Instrumental
 Looking Back on Your Love: Instrumental

External links
 "Over and Over" information at Avex Network.
 "Over and Over" information at Oricon.

1999 singles
Every Little Thing (band) songs
Songs written by Mitsuru Igarashi
Japanese television drama theme songs